The Northern Rhodesia Government Gazette was the government gazette of Northern Rhodesia.

The Gazette replaced the North-Eastern Rhodesia Gazette when North-Eastern and North-Western Rhodesia were merged into Northern Rhodesia. There was no gazette for North-Western Rhodesia.

The Gazette was published by the British South Africa Company from 1911 until it was taken over by the Colonial Office in 1924 when they assumed responsibility for Northern Rhodesia. It continued until independence in 1964 when it was replaced by the Zambian government gazette.

See also
List of British colonial gazettes

References

British colonial gazettes
Publications established in 1911
British South Africa Company
Northern Rhodesia
1911 establishments in Northern Rhodesia
Publications disestablished in 1964
1964 disestablishments in Zambia

Newspapers published in Zambia